West Coast Live is a live album by trumpeter Chet Baker and saxophonist Stan Getz which was recorded in California in 1953 but not released until 1997, on the Pacific Jazz label.

Reception

Lindsay Planer of Allmusic states: "For two men who purportedly would rather not be in the same room at the same time, Baker and Getz are able to create some legitimately brilliant improvisation".

Track listing

Disc One 
 "My Funny Valentine" (Lorenz Hart, Richard Rodgers) - 2:59
 "Strike Up the Band" (George Gershwin, Ira Gershwin) - 5:06
 "The Way You Look Tonight" (Dorothy Fields, Jerome Kern) - 6:18
 "Yardbird Suite" (Charlie Parker) - 4:49
 "Yesterdays" (Otto Harbach, Kern) - 4:23
 "Winter Wonderland" (Felix Bernard, Dick Smith) - 4:09
 "Come Out Wherever You Are" (Sammy Cahn, Jule Styne) - 5:28
 "Move" (Denzil Best) - 4:34
 "What's New?" (Johnny Burke, Bob Haggart) - 3:41
 "Half Nelson" (Miles Davis) - 5:42
 "Little Willie Leaps" (Davis) - 3:55
 "Soft Shoe" (Gerry Mulligan) - 6:06
 "Whispering" (Richard Coburn, Vincent Rose, Malvin Schonberger) - 9:40

Disc Two 
 "Bernie's Tune" (Bernie Miller, Jerry Leiber, Mike Stoller) - 3:39
 "All the Things You Are" (Oscar Hammerstein II, Kern) - 5:33
 "Winter Wonderland" [Take 2] (Bernard, Smith) - 4:18
 "Gone With the Wind" (Herb Magidson, Allie Wrubel) - 5:25
 "All the Things You Are" (Hammerstein, Kern) - 17:42
 "Darn That Dream" (Jimmy Van Heusen, Eddie DeLange) - 12:06
 "Crazy Rhythm" (Irving Caesar, Roger Wolfe Kahn, Joseph Meyer) - 8:41  
Recorded at The Haig in Hollywood on June 12, 1953 (Disc One and Disc Two, tracks 1-4), and Tiffany Club in Los Angeles on August 17, 1954 (Disc Two, tracks 5-7)

Personnel
Chet Baker - trumpet
Stan Getz - tenor saxophone
Russ Freeman - piano (Disc Two, tracks 5-7) 
Carson Smith - bass
Larry Bunker (Disc One and Disc Two, tracks 1-4), Shelly Manne (Disc Two, tracks 5-7) - drums

References 

1997 live albums
Chet Baker live albums
Stan Getz live albums
Pacific Jazz Records live albums